Malda railway division is one of the four railway divisions under Eastern Railway zone of Indian Railways. This railway division was formed in 1975 and its headquarter is located at Malda in the state of West Bengal of India.

Asansol railway division, Sealdah railway division and Howrah railway division are the other railway divisions under ER Zone headquartered at Kolkata.

List of railway stations and towns 
The list includes the stations under the Malda railway division and their station category.

Stations closed for Passengers -

References

 
Divisions of Indian Railways
1975 establishments in West Bengal

Transport in Maldah